Richard Eton (before 1411 – after 1434), of Pirbright and Merrow, Surrey, was an English politician.

Family
Nothing is recorded of his family.

Career
He was a member of Parliament for Guildford in May 1413 and March 1416. He was Mayor of Guildford in 1424–25.

References 

English MPs May 1413
Members of Parliament for Guildford
Mayors of places in Surrey
14th-century births
15th-century deaths
English MPs March 1416